Marie McDonald (born Cora Marie Frye, July 6, 1923 – October 21, 1965) was an American singer and actress known as "The Body Beautiful" and later nicknamed "The Body".

Early life 
Born  in Burgin, Kentucky, McDonald was the daughter of Evertt "Ed" Frye and Marie Taboni (née McDonald) who performed in the Ziegfeld Follies. After her parents divorced, she eventually moved with her mother and stepfather to Yonkers, New York. At the age of 15, she began competing in numerous beauty pageants and was named "The Queen of Coney Island", "Miss Yonkers" and "Miss Loew's Paradise". At the age of 15, she dropped out of school and began modeling. In 1939, McDonald was named "Miss New York State". Later that same year, she debuted in George White's Scandals of 1939. The following year, at age 17, she landed a showgirl role in the Broadway production at the Earl Carroll Theatre called Earl Carroll's Vanities.

Shortly thereafter, she moved to Hollywood hoping to develop a career in show business. She continued modeling and continued to work for the owner of the Broadway theatre as a showgirl at his Sunset Boulevard nightclub.

Career 
After auditioning for Tommy Dorsey in December 1940, she joined Dorsey & His Orchestra on his radio show and she later performed with other big bands. Dorsey suggested that she change her last name from "Frye" to her mother's maiden name "McDonald", which she used professionally for the rest of her life. In 1942, she was put under contract by Universal for $75 a week and immediately appeared in several minor roles. That year, she appeared in three motion pictures, most notably, Pardon My Sarong, which earned her the nickname "The Body" for her shapely physique.

She was eventually dropped by Universal and signed with Paramount Pictures, earning $100 a week. While at Paramount, McDonald appeared in Lucky Jordan (1942). The following year, she was lent to Republic Pictures, where she co-starred in A Scream in the Dark, a "B" detective mystery that met with reasonable success. During World War II, McDonald became one of Hollywood's most popular pin-up girls and posed for the United States military magazine, Yank. While she initially did not mind being called "The Body", McDonald soon grew tired of the nickname and focus on her body and expressed a desire to be known for her acting and singing skills.

She returned to Paramount where she appeared in supporting roles. In 1944, McDonald co-starred in Guest in the House, in which she received the first positive reviews in her career. Her next starring role came when she worked for independent producer Edward Small as the title character in the 1945 screwball comedy Getting Gertie's Garter. In 1947, she signed with Metro-Goldwyn-Mayer and co-starred with Gene Kelly in Living in a Big Way (1947). McDonald and Kelly did not get along while shooting and the film was a financial failure. She bought out the rest of her contract at MGM and went to Columbia Pictures where she appeared in a supporting role in Tell It to the Judge (1949).

In 1950, McDonald appeared in Once a Thief and Hit Parade of 1951, which would be her final films for the next eight years. For the remainder of the 1950s, she focused on theatre and music, recording an LP for RCA Victor in 1957, The Body Sings, backed by Hal Borne and His Orchestra, which consisted of twelve standard ballads. She also toured the world in a very successful nightclub act. She returned to the screen in 1958, when she was cast as actress Lola Livingston in The Geisha Boy, a slapstick comedy, opposite Jerry Lewis. In 1963, she made her last film appearance in the sex comedy Promises! Promises!, opposite Jayne Mansfield.

Personal life
McDonald's seven marriages and various romances kept her in the media throughout her career. Her first marriage was to sportswriter Richard Allord in 1940. The marriage was annulled after three weeks. In January 1943, she married her agent, Victor Orsatti, in Reno, Nevada. They divorced in May 1947. While awaiting her divorce from Orsatti, McDonald had an affair with mobster Benjamin "Bugsy" Siegel. Siegel reportedly dumped McDonald because of her chronic tardiness.

McDonald's third and fourth marriages were to millionaire shoe manufacturer Harry Karl. They initially married in September 1947. After McDonald suffered several miscarriages, the couple adopted two children, Denice and Harrison. They separated in August 1954 and were divorced that November. Shortly thereafter, the couple announced that they would remarry. By January 1955 however, McDonald claimed that plans to remarry were "all off" because she discovered she was allergic to Karl. Despite this claim, McDonald and Karl remarried in Arizona in June 1955. They separated in March 1956 and, in May, Karl filed for divorce claiming that McDonald had beat him, causing him "grievous mental suffering". At the time of their separation, McDonald was pregnant with the couple's first biological child. Karl dropped the divorce suit in June. In July, McDonald filed for divorce from Karl and was granted an interlocutory divorce decree later that month but their divorce was never finalized. Their daughter, Tina Marie, was born in September 1956. During their separation, McDonald dated Michael Wilding. McDonald and Karl reconciled again in 1957 but separated again in December 1957. They divorced for good on April 16, 1958. Karl would go on to marry actress Debbie Reynolds.

During her final separation from Karl, McDonald began dating George Capri. Capri was one of the owners of the Flamingo Las Vegas. On June 12, 1958, Capri accompanied McDonald to the hospital after she accidentally overdosed on sleeping pills while the two were staying in Las Vegas. The following month, McDonald told the media that the two planned to marry after Capri's divorce. They broke up in September 1958.

On May 23, 1959, McDonald married television executive Louis Bass in Las Vegas. She filed for divorce after ten months, charging Bass with "mental cruelty". On August 6, 1961, she married banker and attorney Edward Callahan in Las Vegas. On September 17, 1962, Callahan filed suit in Los Angeles asking for a divorce from McDonald for mental cruelty or that the marriage be annulled due to fraud. Callahan claimed that the two had only lived together for two days because McDonald had no intention of making a home with him or having his children. Callahan also charged that McDonald would not convert to Roman Catholicism.  McDonald counter sued dismissing Callahan's claim, stating that they had lived together until September 7. She also claimed that Callahan had committed adultery and borrowed $2600 from her to finance their wedding and honeymoon which he did not repay. McDonald married for the seventh time in 1963 to her sixth and final husband, Donald Taylor. They met while she was appearing in Promises, Promises, the final film which Taylor produced. They remained married until McDonald's death.

Alleged kidnapping

On January 4, 1957, McDonald's mother phoned police claiming that a man who sounded "nervous" called her at her home in Woodland Hills, Los Angeles at around 12 a.m. and told her that he had abducted her daughter from her Los Angeles home. McDonald's mother went to her daughter's house and discovered a note in the mailbox instructing her not to call the police and that "they" would be in touch with her. Approximately two hours later, McDonald's then estranged husband Harry Karl also received a call from a male who sounded "like a nervous young kid" also informing him not to call police if he wanted to see McDonald alive again.

While McDonald was supposedly being held by her abductors at another home, she telephoned her agent Harold Plant, actor Michael Wilding (whom she was dating at the time), and columnist Harrison Carroll. McDonald told Carroll that two men kidnapped her from her house, demanded that she give them her ring and money and gave her "a shot of something". McDonald later said one of the men discovered her making the call to Carroll; he then took the phone from her, slapped her, blindfolded her and loaded her into a car. According to McDonald, the two men drove with her for some time and discussed taking her to a house in Mexico but, after hearing reports of her kidnapping on the radio, decided against this idea and dumped her on the side of the road.

On January 5, a truck driver discovered McDonald on a highway near Indio, California. After being rescued, McDonald told police that on January 4, "two swarthy men" came to her house brandishing a sawed-off gun demanding that she open the door or they would shoot into the bedrooms of her children. After entering the home, McDonald said the two men took some jewelry, prepared a note and discussed demanding a $30,000 ransom for her return. The men then allowed McDonald to put on a robe and slippers and pack a small carrying case. They then forced her into their car where she claimed she was blindfolded and driven to a home. At the home, McDonald said the men forced her to swallow pills which made her drowsy. She also claimed that she was able to make the three phone calls when the men left the room. A doctor who examined McDonald discovered she had two cracked teeth, bruises on her face and abrasions on her neck, legs and cheek but was otherwise unharmed. The doctor concluded that McDonald's injuries were not consistent with the supposed assault she claimed the two men inflicted on her.

Police immediately began to doubt McDonald's story, which changed several times. Those doubts were furthered when it was discovered that the newspapers which the two supposed abductors used to construct the note found in McDonald's mailbox were found in McDonald's fireplace. Upon searching McDonald's home, police found a copy of the novel The Fuzzy Pink Nightgown, by Sylvia Tate. The book tells the story of a movie star who is kidnapped by two men. One investigator noticed that details in the book matched McDonald's story. Police then asked McDonald to undergo a polygraph test but her lawyer refused. McDonald agreed to reenact the abduction which the police filmed. Her estranged husband Harry Karl also doubted the story and claimed McDonald was "not a well woman". He also said that he doubted that two men would have easily abducted her as she would have surely fought back. McDonald then accused Karl of orchestrating the abduction for publicity purposes (Karl denied this, calling her claims "absurd and ridiculous"). She later admitted that she made up Karl's alleged involvement.

After investigating the alleged kidnapping, police admitted that they could find no conclusive evidence that the event took place, due to "perplexing discrepancies". On January 16, a grand jury convened to investigate the kidnapping. McDonald testified that her story changed frequently because she was in shock when she gave her initial statement and had been taking sedatives when she gave other statements. After weighing the evidence, the grand jury could not come up with any conclusive evidence to bring charges against anyone.

Death 
On October 21, 1965, McDonald's sixth husband, Donald F. Taylor, found her slumped over her dressing table in their Hidden Hills, California home. On October 30, the coroner announced that McDonald's death was caused by "active drug intoxication due to multiple drugs" and was determined to be an accident or a suicide. The case was then referred to a suicide team of psychologists and psychiatrists who would determine the final mode of her death. McDonald's funeral was held on October 23 at the Church of the Recessional at Forest Lawn Memorial Park, Glendale in Glendale, California. Her remains were interred in the Freedom Mausoleum at Forest Lawn Memorial Park, Glendale. In December 1965, the suicide team classified her death as "accidental" after determining that she likely did not choose to die by suicide.

Three months after McDonald's death, on January 3, 1966, her widower, Donald F. Taylor, died of an intentional overdose of Seconal. McDonald's three surviving children were raised by Harry Karl (her former husband) and his wife, Debbie Reynolds. On May 4, 1967, McDonald's father, Evertt "Ed" Frye, died by a self-inflicted gunshot to the head in the garage of his New Smyrna Beach, Florida home.

Filmography

References

External links 

 
 
 

1923 births
1965 deaths
20th-century American actresses
Accidental deaths in California
Actresses from Kentucky
American film actresses
American musical theatre actresses
American stage actresses
American television actresses
Burials at Forest Lawn Memorial Park (Glendale)
Drug-related deaths in California
Metro-Goldwyn-Mayer contract players
Paramount Pictures contract players
People from Mercer County, Kentucky
RCA Victor artists
Traditional pop music singers
20th-century American singers
Singers from Kentucky
20th-century American women singers
1965 suicides